Simple Plan is a Canadian rock band from Montreal, Quebec, formed in 1999. The band's lineup consists of Pierre Bouvier (lead vocals, bass guitar), Chuck Comeau (drums), Jeff Stinco (lead guitar), and Sébastien Lefebvre (rhythm guitar, backing vocals), with all four performing with the group since its inception. David Desrosiers (bass guitar, backing vocals) joined the band in early 2000 and departed in July 2020 due to sexual misconduct accusations. The band has released six studio albums: No Pads, No Helmets...Just Balls (2002), Still Not Getting Any... (2004),  Simple Plan (2008), Get Your Heart On! (2011), Taking One for the Team (2016), and Harder Than It Looks (2022). The band has also released an EP titled Get Your Heart On – The Second Coming! (2013), in addition to two live albums: Live in Japan 2002 (2003) and MTV Hard Rock Live (2005).

The band performed at the Vans Warped Tour every year from 1999 to 2005, and in 2011, 2013, 2015, and 2018. The band also performed at the 2010 Winter Olympics closing ceremony, along with The X Factor Australia. In December 2012, the band performed at Mood Indigo, the college festival of IIT Bombay in Mumbai, India. In 2004, the band appeared as themselves in the film New York Minute, starring the Olsen twins, Mary-Kate and Ashley. Simple Plan also performed O Canada at the 2016 NHL Winter Classic. They also performed the theme music for and were featured on an episode of What's New, Scooby-Doo?.

History

1999–2001: Formation and early years

In 1993, lead vocalist Pierre Bouvier and drummer Chuck Comeau were in a band named Reset. In 1998, Comeau left soon after to go to college. In mid 1999, he met with high school friends and guitarists Jeff Stinco and Sébastien Lefebvre who were in separate bands of their own. They combined to create Simple Plan. In late 1999, Bouvier and Comeau reacquainted at a Sugar Ray concert and Bouvier left Reset soon after to join Comeau in the band. Bassist and backing vocalist David Desrosiers replaced Bouvier in Reset, but he too left the band six months later to join Simple Plan. This allowed Bouvier, who had doubled as the band's lead vocalist and bassist, to concentrate on the singing, and Stinco, who had doubled as the band's lead guitarist and backing vocalist, to concentrate on the guitar. In 2001 the band performed at Edgefest II in Toronto.

Originally the band didn't have the name, before, the band considered named Touchdown 999, later Bouvier friends choose the name Simple Plan, which derived from the 1998 film of the same name.

2002–2003: No Pads, No Helmets...Just Balls
In 2002, Simple Plan released their debut studio album, No Pads, No Helmets...Just Balls, which featured the singles "I'm Just a Kid", "I'd Do Anything", "Addicted", and "Perfect". The band was aiming for a pure pop-punk record.

The record was originally released in the United States with 12 tracks, ending with "Perfect". Enhanced and foreign editions came in several different versions with up to two additional tracks in addition to the original 12. Two pop punk singers contributed on vocals:

"I'd Do Anything" included vocals by Mark Hoppus from Blink-182, and "You Don't Mean Anything" included vocals by Joel Madden from Good Charlotte.

The years of 2002 and 2003 were very formative for the band. MTV Networks featured "Addicted" on one of their top performing shows during the spring of 2003 in the United States and internationally; on MTV and MTVu, and was filmed at the University at Buffalo (SUNY Buffalo) in Western New York. Addicted was the theme song for Fraternity Life. While the show was taken off the air the following season the band continued to rise on the billboard charts in the United States and performances continued to be booked and reruns of the show played around the world.

In 2002, the band also performed and recorded the theme song for a rebooted installment of the Scooby-Doo franchise, What's New, Scooby-Doo?. This show used the band's intro throughout its entire run until its conclusion in 2006. It also featured many of the band's songs within episodes of the show, including "I'd Do Anything".

In 2003, the band played as a headliner on the Vans Warped Tour — an appearance memorialized in the comedy slasher film, Punk Rock Holocaust, in which four of the five band members are killed. The band also played short stints on the Warped Tour in 2004 and 2005. That same year (2003) the band opened for Avril Lavigne on her "Try To Shut Me Up" Tour. In addition to several headlining tours, the band has also opened for Green Day and Good Charlotte. The album had sold one million copies in early 2003 then went on to sell over four million copies worldwide, making it the band's best selling album to date.

2004–2006: Still Not Getting Any...
In 2004, Simple Plan released its second album, Still Not Getting Any... which was produced by Bob Rock and led to the subsequent singles, "Welcome to My Life", "Shut Up", "Untitled (How Could This Happen to Me?)", "Crazy", and (in some markets) "Perfect World".

According to the album's bonus DVD, the band originally considered other names for it like Get Rich or Die Trying, Enema of the State, and In The Zone before deciding on Still Not Getting Any.... The name stemmed from the band's belief that they were not getting any good reviews, with Bouvier once noting that the band only had one recent good review in Alternative Press. Still Not Getting Any... was a musical departure from the group's previous album: the band retained its style of downbeat lyrics matched to upbeat music, but managed to transcend from the standard pop punk genre. Although many of the tracks on this CD still carried the feeling of teen angst that is probably most noticeable in "I'm Just a Kid" from No Pads, No Helmets...Just Balls, the general slant of this album tends toward slightly deeper and more mature lyrical themes, as well as a more mainstream sound that edges away from the pure pop punk style of the group's last album. Some critics have pointed towards the inclusion of "classic" or "mainstream" rock elements, claiming the album "de-emphasizes punk-pop hyperactivity in favor of straightforward, well-crafted modern rock".

In 2005, their cover version of Cheap Trick's "Surrender" was featured in the soundtrack album for the superhero film, Fantastic Four.
 
Lyrics from "Welcome to My Life" are featured in edition 97 of the xkcd webcomic A Simple Plan.

2006–2009: Simple Plan

After nearly a year and a half in support of Still Not Getting Any..., the band ended most touring in February 2006. They were playing only a few shows, taking some time off, and beginning work on the third studio album. Bouvier headed to Miami as on about 21 March 2007 to work with Dave Fortman. The band entered the studio for pre-production in Los Angeles on 29 June. On 15 July the band returned to Montréal to record at Studio Piccolo, the same studio in which the band had recorded Still Not Getting Any.... The band finished recording and headed back to Miami and Los Angeles to mix the album. The final part of making the record was done in New York City, and it was officially completed on 21 October.

When I'm Gone, the first single from Simple Plan, was released on 29 October. This album was produced by both Dave Fortman and Max Martin. On 17 February 2008, the band achieved its highest charting single in the U.K. After the first two albums just missed the UK top 40, "When I'm Gone" gave the band its best chart position in the UK, coming in at number 26.

Simple Plan held an extensive tour schedule in support of the album. After completing an around-the-world promotional tour, they played several holiday shows during December 2007. After they continued promotional tours in January, Simple Plan played a triple bill in Camden Town, London on 27 January 2008, with the first show featuring songs from the band's first CD, the second from the second, and the third from the new release. The band played four U.S. shows in late February, and completed a European tour running until late April. The band played four Japan dates, followed by several European festivals and headlining dates. On 1 July 2008, the band gave a free concert on Québec City's Plains of Abraham, attracting a crowd of 150,000 people to the Canada Day show. After a return to the Far East in late July and early August, the band played a Cross Canada Tour with Faber Drive, Cute is What We Aim For and Metro Station.  After dates in Germany, Mexico, and Australia, the band played its second full European tour of the year from 28 October to 29 November, playing in Estonia and Poland for the first time. The band also played in Tel Aviv and Dubai in early December—shows at which the band played as a four-piece, with Desrosiers absent due to a family emergency and Lefebvre on bass.

2010–2013: Get Your Heart On!

The band's fourth album Get Your Heart On! was released on 21 June 2011. The album marks Simple Plan's second time since No Pads, No Helmets...Just Balls to feature collaborations with other artists, including Weezer's Rivers Cuomo, Marie-Mai, Natasha Bedingfield, K'naan and Alex Gaskarth of All Time Low. In April, "Jet Lag" was released in English and French versions featuring singers Natasha Bedingfield and Marie-Mai respectively. The band was on the roster of Warped Tour 2011 for selected dates in June and July 2011.

In September and October 2011, Simple Plan performed four shows in Australia, on the "Get Your Heart On" tour, with supporting bands Tonight Alive and New Empire. During the Australian tour, Jenna McDougall from Tonight Alive featured in "Jet Lag". We the Kings supported Simple Plan in Europe on a tour in spring 2012. The song "Last One Standing" was featured on the NASCAR The Game: Inside Line soundtrack. Simple Plan also performed live with the Montreal Symphony Orchestra at Montreal Symphony House in Montréal, Quebec, Canada on 20 September 2011, raising over $500,000 for sick children and young people in need.

An EP titled Get Your Heart On – The Second Coming! was released on 3 December. Consequently, Simple Plan uploaded the DVD, directed by Peter John from Epik Films and shot by Peter John for the official Simple Plan YouTube channel, in high quality for free as a gift to the fans.

2014–2017: Taking One for the Team
In March 2014, when the band members started recording the first demos for the album, it was announced through My Chemical Romance rhythm guitarist Frank Iero's Instagram that Iero is working with Simple Plan on the next album. This information was later confirmed by Comeau; the band estimated to release the album in the second half of 2015, plus the band discussed the band's future projects. On 30 July 2014, the band formally stated that the music writing for the next album had begun. In December 2014, Simple Plan started to choose which songs would be included on the album. "Saturday", was released on 21 June 2015, although the band stated this song would not be in the album.

In April 2015, Simple Plan performed with up-and-coming Canadian singer Andee at the FIFA Women's World Cup Trophy Tour at MUCH in Toronto.

Simple Plan toured on the 2015 Vans Warped Tour, performing a total of five shows.

On 28 August 2015, the band released "Boom", a song from the upcoming fifth album. On the same day, a music video was released for the song, which contains footage from the 2015 Vans Warped Tour, The Alternative Press Music Awards, and a performance in Montreal at New City Gas; the video contains cameos from members of the bands MxPx, All Time Low, New Found Glory, PVRIS, Pierce the Veil, The Summer Set, Silverstein, Black Veil Brides, Parkway Drive and Issues.

On 18 September 2015, the band released a second song from the fifth studio album, "I Don't Wanna Be Sad," and a third called "I Don't Wanna Go to Bed," featuring rapper Nelly on 16 October 2015.

On 17 October 2015, it was leaked by Pierre Bouvier that there will be a song called "Kiss Me Like Nobody's Watching". On 30 November 2015, the band revealed the title of the album would be Taking One for the Team. The group set the release date for 19 February 2016, along with the album cover and the first tour dates of the Taking One for the Team Tour, with shows scheduled in European countries Also in 2016 the band performed at the 2016 NHL Winter Classic at Gillette Stadium against the Montreal Canadiens and Boston Bruins. They performed O Canada during the pregame and also performed during the second intermission.

"Opinion Overload", the second single from Taking One for the Team was released on 5 February 2016. Simple Plan released their third single "Singing in the Rain" internationally on 12 April. The album was released on 19 February 2016. It was described as a "pure, no-frills, feel-good fun, a start-to-finish crowd-pleaser for fans of that classic pop-punk sound." On 5 December, Simple Plan released "Christmas Everyday", 15 years after their last Christmas song and first single, "My Christmas List". In 2017, the band embarked on a tour called No Pads, No Helmets...Just Balls (15th Anniversary Tour Edition) in support of the album in question's anniversary, during which they played the entire album front to back during each show.

2017–2021: Desrosiers' departure

From May 2017 until June 2019, David Desrosiers had been on hiatus from touring with Simple Plan, while he was at home recovering from depression. During that time, a touring musician named Chady Awad had been performing bass with the band as a touring substitute for more than two years, while Bouvier and Lefebvre had divided Desrosiers' vocal parts. This marks the second time Desrosiers has been absent from the band; the first time was in December 2008, when Lefebvre temporarily switched to bass for 2 weeks during live performances.

In September 2017, while interviewed by Purdue University, Jeff Stinco revealed that the band would start working on their new album in early 2018.

On 5 September 2018, Music in Minnesota reported that members of Simple Plan spent a day in Owatonna, Minnesota to appear in scenes of a punk rock musical titled Summertime Dropouts. The feature film was released in the fall of 2019. Simple Plan recorded a song called "Bigger", which was released on the soundtrack of the film  on 16 November 2018.

On 8 June 2019, the band reunited with Desrosiers in Cleveland, Ohio, marking his official return to the band.

On 2 September 2019, Pierre Bouvier revealed that the band had fulfilled their contract to Atlantic and were now free agents, and hinted at releasing new music later in the year.

In October 2019, Simple Plan released a collaboration track with State Champs and We the Kings called "Where I Belong"; the three also conducted a tour together.

On 10 July 2020, it was announced that Desrosiers had parted ways with Simple Plan for the third time after being accused of sexual misconduct on social media. Their touring bassist Chady Awad left the band over sexual allegations five days later.

On July 22, 2021, the band re-recorded the What's New, Scooby-Doo? theme song and made it available for streaming.

2021–present: Harder Than It Looks
On November 5, 2021, the band released "The Antidote", the first single from their sixth album. It was their first self-released album, distributed by The Orchard. On February 18, 2022, the band released the single "Ruin My Life", featuring vocals from Deryck Whibley of Sum 41. On February 22, 2022, the band announced a U.S. tour with Sum 41 called the Blame Canada tour set to run from April to August 2022. On March 15, 2022, the band announced the release of their sixth studio album Harder Than It Looks with a release of the third promotional single "Congratulations". On April 8, 2022, the band released the album's fourth single, "Wake Me Up (When This Nightmare's Over)". The album was released on May 6, 2022, to positive reception, reaching #84 Canadian Albums, #55 Top Current Album Sales (US), and #90 Top Album Sales (US) on the Billboard Charts.

Simple Plan started the "Blame Canada" tour on April 29, 2022 and on May 16th, 2022 Simple Plan announced they would be continuing their tour with Sum 41 with a European tour beginning September 2022.

The single "Iconic" from the album garnered sync placements including: AT&T Sportsnet- Pittsburgh Penguins & Pittsburgh Pirates TV Broadcasts Fox Sports, NASCAR promotions (Race Hub and Race Day: Xfinity), and Riot Games- LSC Finals Video Game Tournament (League of Legends).

Musical style
Simple Plan's musical style has been described as pop-punk, alternative rock, pop rock, power pop, emo, and punk rock. Atlantic Records marketing material has described the band's style as having "classic punk energy and modern pop sonics".

Simple Plan Foundation
The members of Simple Plan created the Simple Plan Foundation, which focuses on teen problems ranging from suicide to poverty to drug addiction. As of 9 December 2005, the Simple Plan Foundation had raised more than $100,000.

A fundraising event was held in September 2009 in Montréal. In October 2008, the band announced a special release on iTunes of the single "Save You", to benefit the Foundation, with a special composite video featuring cancer survivors. The song was inspired by the struggle with cancer of Bouvier's brother Jay.

On 15 March 2011, the Foundation stated it would donate $10,000 in aid after the 2011 earthquake that hit Japan.

In 2012, to mark the band's 10th anniversary, the book Simple Plan: The Official Story was released, which was used as a fundraiser for the Simple Plan Foundation.

Band members
Current members
 Pierre Bouvier – lead vocals (1999–present); bass guitar (1999–2000; studio 2020–present); acoustic guitar and percussion (2000–present)
 Chuck Comeau – drums, percussion (1999–present)
 Jeff Stinco – lead guitar (1999–present); backing vocals (1999–2000)
 Sébastien Lefebvre – rhythm guitar, backing vocals (1999–present); bass guitar (touring 2008, 2016)

Former members
 David Desrosiers – bass guitar, backing and lead vocals, additional percussion (2000–2020; hiatus 2008, 2016, 2017–2020)

Touring members
 Chady Awad – bass guitar (2016, 2017–2019, 2020)

Timeline

Discography

Studio albums

 No Pads, No Helmets...Just Balls (2002)
 Still Not Getting Any... (2004)
  Simple Plan (2008)
 Get Your Heart On! (2011)
 Taking One for the Team (2016)
 Harder Than It Looks (2022)

Awards and nominations

Radio Canada/La Presse Awards

 2013 Nominated for Arts and Entertainment Award

Dahsyatnya Awards

 2013 Nominated for Outstanding Guest Star

CASBY Awards

 2002 Won CASBY Award

Juno Awards

 2012 Won Allan Waters Humanitarian Award
 2009 Nominated for Juno Award
 2009 Nominated for Juno Award (for the group itself)
 2006 Won Juno Fan Choice Award
 2005 Nominated for Juno Award
 2005 Nominated for Juno Award
 2005 Nominated for Juno Award

Kerrang! Awards

 2008 Nominated for Kerrang! Award

MTV Asia Awards

 2006 Nominated for Favourite Pop Act

MTV Europe Music Awards
 2014 Nominated for MTV Europe Music Award (Best World Stage- WS Monterrey)

MTV Video Music Awards

 2004 Nominated for MTV Video Music Award
 2003 Nominated for MTV Video Music Award

MuchMusic Video Awards

 2012 Nominated for MuchMusic Video Award (Best International Video by a Canadian)
 2012 Nominated for MuchMusic Video Award (UR FAVE VIDEO)
 2011 Nominated for MuchMusic Video Award
 2009 Won MuchMusic Video Award
 2008 Won MuchMusic Video Award
 2008 Nominated for MuchMusic Video Award
 2008 Nominated for MuchMusic Video Award
 2006 Won MuchMusic Video Award
 2006 Nominated for MuchMusic Video Award
 2006 Nominated for MuchMusic Video Award
 2005 Won MuchMusic Video Award
 2005 Nominated for MuchMusic Video Award
 2005 Nominated for MuchMusic Video Award
 2004 Won MuchMusic Video Award
 2003 Won MuchMusic Video Award

NRJ Music Awards

 2012 Won NRJ Music Award
 2007 Nominated for NRJ Music Award

Teen Choice Awards

 2008 Nominated for Teen Choice Award
 2005 Won Teen Choice Award
ADISQ

 2006 Won Artiste québécois s'étant le plus illustré hors Québec
 2006 Won Album de l'année – Anglophone

References

External links

Simple Plan official website

 
Musical groups established in 1999
Emo musical groups
1999 establishments in Quebec
Musical groups from Montreal
Canadian pop punk groups
Canadian punk rock groups
Canadian alternative rock groups
Canadian power pop groups
Atlantic Records artists
Juno Fan Choice Award winners
English-language musical groups from Quebec